Willington may refer to:

Places

In England 
 Willington, Bedfordshire
 Willington, Cheshire
 Willington, County Durham
 Willington A.F.C., football club
 Willington, Derbyshire
Willington Power Station, former coal-fired station
 Willington, Kent
 Willington, Tyne and Wear
 Willington, Warwickshire
Willington Quay, North Tyneside
Willington Athletic F.C., former football club

In the United States 
Willington, Connecticut
Willington, South Carolina

People 
 Aaron Smith Willington (1781–1862), American journalist and newspaper editor
 Avis Willington (born 1956), British Olympic swimmer
 Daniel Willington (born 1942), Argentine footballer
 Willington Ortiz (born 1952), Colombian footballer
 Willington Techera (born 1985), Uruguayan footballer

Other uses 
 Willington railway station, Derbyshire, England
 Willington railway station (Bedfordshire), England, a former station
 Willington railway station (Durham), England, a former station
 Willington School, Wimbledon, London

See also 
 
 Wellington (disambiguation)